An Operation Forsythe Park (also: Operation Forsyth Park) in Albu Bali, located 15 kilometers northeast of Ramadi, was completed on Wednesday 5 May 2007 in Ramadi, Iraq by approx 450 Iraqi Security and Coalition Forces.

Mission
Al Anbar Provincial Security Force 2, Iraqi Army demolition experts and U.S. Soldiers from 3rd Battalion, 69th Armor Regiment, 1st Brigade Combat Team, 3rd Infantry Division, Task Force Pathfinder (with elements from the 321st Engineer Battalion and C company 397th Engineer company) conducted the weeks long clearing operation, targeting one of the remaining hotspots in the brigade's area of operations. TF Pathfinder spent long hours conducting route clearance, often on mission for more than 24 hours at a time, clearing IED threats so that Provincial Security Force 2 could complete their mission.

Operation Forsythe Park started in the early morning hours of 26 April with multiple Coalition Soldiers being injured in the opening minutes of the Operation by IED's that had been emplaced in strategic areas such as land bridges over canals, with command executed detonations. One such firing point was traced out at over 600 meters and had to be dug out with a pick. This is a prime example of the insurgents having placed these devices months, even years in advance in certain areas designed to keep Coalition Forces out of the area.

"We had seen an increased amount of enemy activity in this region over the last three weeks", said Col. John Charlton, commanding officer for 1BCT. "Once we set the conditions and built sufficient combat power, we took the fight to the enemy and provided much needed relief to the population".

"During the operation, Coalition forces were attacked almost daily by rocket propelled grenades, small arms fire, IED's ranging in size from 10 pounds to 150-200 pounds of explosives. There was also the constant threat of snipers, heavy machine gun fire, and improvised rockets." Said Master Sergeant David Johnson of B Co 321st Engineer Battalion, TF Pathfinder. 
"We would take over for another team that had been working on clearing the roads, and we would have vehicles blown up by an IED that had been dug into the sides of the elevated roads, that left no visual clues, before we had reached the limit of advance from the previous route clearance team. Speed was a killer, 1-2 miles an hour was a good pace and the Soldiers in the lead vehicles got very good at their jobs of spotting thin copper wire, or what was referred to as a 'snail trail' in the dirt roads, or cracks in paved portions."

Result
The multiple day operation marks the eighth large-scale operation for the brigade this year.  The police and soldiers discovered multiple weapon caches, including 28 improvised explosive devices, three 14.5 mm anti-aircraft guns, five mortars, 300 pounds of homemade explosives, 2200 gallons of nitric acid and 200 blasting caps.
Six coalition service members, several Iraqi Soldiers and police, along with multiple insurgents were killed during the operation.

Units
United States Units
3rd Battalion, 69th Armor Regiment, 1st Brigade Combat Team, 3rd Infantry Division
Firepower Control Team 6, Detachment F, 4th Air Naval Gunfire Liaison Company, II Marine Expeditionary Force (FWD)
Task Force Pathfinder ( 321st Engineer Battalion, C/397th Engineers)
Iraq Units
Provincial Security Force 2, Iraqi Army
7th Division Iraqi Army Intelligence Surveillance and Reconnaissance Company
7th Division Iraqi Army Explosive Ordnance Disposal Company

See also

Al-Qaeda in Iraq
Operation Imposing Law
Operation Phantom Thunder
Operation Arrowhead Ripper

References

External links
 Release RELEASE No. 20070504-17 Official Website of the Multinational Force - Iraq

Military operations of the Iraq War in 2007
Military operations of the Iraq War involving the United States
Military operations of the Iraq War involving Iraq